Paolo Ciavatta (born 6 November 1984 in Nereto) is an Italian former professional cyclist, who rode professionally between 2010 and 2016 for the  and  teams.

Major results

2009
 1st Giro del Cigno
 2nd Gara Ciclistica Montappone
 2nd Trofeo Salvatore Morucci
2010
 5th Gran Premio Città di Camaiore
2011
 9th Trofeo Laigueglia
2014
 1st  Mountains classification Vuelta a Castilla y León
 10th Gran Premio di Lugano
2015
 3rd GP Izola
 6th Overall Sibiu Cycling Tour
2016
 10th Coupe des Carpathes

References

External links

1984 births
Living people
Italian male cyclists
Sportspeople from the Province of Teramo
Cyclists from Abruzzo